Zsuzsi kisasszony (literally "Miss Suzy",  also known as Miss Springtime and Die Faschingsfee) is an operetta in 3 acts by Hungarian composer Emmerich Kálmán.  It premiered at the Vig theatre in Budapest on February 23, 1915. The Hungarian language libretto was by Martos and M. Bródy.  As Miss Springtime, it opened, in heavily revised form, on Broadway in 1916.

With a German libretto by Alfred Maria Willner and Rudolf Österreicher, a revised version of the music premiered as Die Faschingsfee (The Carnival Fairy) in Vienna, at the Johann Strauss Theater, on 21 September 1917. A further revision of Die Faschingsfee was done for Berlin, with a larger role for the leading lady, and it is the Berlin version that is most often seen today. In 2012, an English translation of the Berlin version was done at the Ohio Light Opera under the title Miss Springtime, but the recording made of that production was eventually released in 2013 under the title The Carnival Fairy.

Roles in Zsuzsi Kisasszony

Roles in Die Faschingsfee

Synopses
The plot of Zsuzsi Kisasszony concerns Zsuzsi, a small-town girl who runs off to Budapest with Falsetti, a famous tenor, only to return, somewhat the wiser, to her old home and Péterfy, her old sweetheart.

The plot of Die Faschingsfee revolves around an artist, Victor, who in defending the honor of an unknown woman (Princess Alexandra Maria, as it turns out) offends his patron and loses a large stipend. In the end, all comes out right.

Film
, directed by Hans Steinhoff (Germany, 1931)

Sources 
 
 A survey of Kalman operettas

Operas by Emmerich Kálmán
1915 operas
Hungarian-language operettas
Operas set in Hungary
Operas set in Austria
Hungarian music
Operas adapted into films